This is a list of Venice Biennale exhibitions.

Art

Notes

References

Bibliography 

 
 

Venice Biennale